Palani taluk is a taluk of Dindigul district of the Indian state of Tamil Nadu. The headquarters of the taluk is the town of Palani.

Demographics
According to the 2011 census, the taluk of Palani had a population of 290,924 with 145,091 males and 145,833 females. There were 1,005 women for every 1,000 men. The taluk had a literacy rate of 69.25%. Child population in the age group below 6 years were 12,358 males and 11,731 females.

References 

 http://tnmaps.tn.nic.in/vill.php?dcode=13&centcode=0001&tlkname=Palani

Taluks of Dindigul district